In molecular biology, MER1 repeat containing imprinted transcript 1 (non-protein coding), also known as MIMT1 is a long non-coding RNA. It is an imprinted gene, which is paternally expressed. Deletion of this gene is lethal in cattle, causing still births and abortions. It is lethal in 85% of individuals with the deletion, it is thought that incomplete silencing of maternally imprinted alleles allows some individuals with the deletion to survive.

See also
 Long noncoding RNA

References

Non-coding RNA